Morowa Yejidé is an American novelist. She was long listed for the 2022 Women’s Prize for Fiction.

She graduated from Kalamazoo College, and Wilkes University. She is a faculty member at Georgia Tech.

Works 

 Time of the locust : a novel, Atria Books, New York, 2014.  
 Creatures of Passage Akashic Books, Brooklyn, 2021.

References 

21st-century American novelists
Year of birth missing (living people)
Living people
Place of birth missing (living people)
American women novelists
Kalamazoo College alumni
Wilkes University alumni
Georgia Tech faculty